Bernard William (died 1118) was the Count of Berga (from 1094, as Bernard II) and Count of Cerdanya (from 1109).

A son of William I of Cerdanya and Sancha of Barcelona, he inherited Berga from his father in 1094. On the death of his brother William-Jordan in 1109, he inherited Cerdanya. In 1111, after the death of Bernard III of Besalú, he opposed the integration of Besalú into the County of Barcelona as it was technically a feudatory of Cerdanya, as were Fenollet and Vallespir. However, he eventually agreed to abdicate these counties to his cousin and friend Raymond Berengar III of Barcelona. When he himself died seven years later without heirs, Cerdanya passed to Barcelona.

11th-century births
1118 deaths
12th-century Catalan people